Sun Shenglu (1928 in Dingxing County, Hebei – December 3, 1952) was a MiG-15 pilot of the People's Republic of China. He was a flying ace during the Korean War, with 6 victories.

A member of the 3rd Fighter Aviation Division, Sun was killed in action on December 3, 1952 near the Ch'ongch'on River.

Although all Chinese aces have received the title Combat Hero in acknowledgement of their services, very little information is known of the Chinese pilots during the war due to the lack of published records.

See also 
List of Korean War flying aces

References 

Chinese Korean War flying aces
1928 births
1952 deaths
Chinese military personnel killed in the Korean War
Aviators killed by being shot down